Visvanatha Sastriyar (or Visvanathan) (1756–1845) was a Tamil poet and astronomer of Sri Lankan Tamil ancestry. Sir Emerson Tennent called him "the most celebrated astronomer in Ceylon".

Early life 

Visvanatha Sastriyar was born in Araly in the Vaddukoddai region near Jaffna to Narayana Sastri in a Tamil Brahmin family in 1756.

As astronomer 

Visvanathan published a yearly almanac or panchangam till his death. This almanac was known for its accuracy. Visvanathan was praised for his work and was awarded the sole privilege of being considered  "Almanac Maker for His Majesty, George IV". Sir Emerson Tennent, in his book "Christianity in Ceylon", wrote of Visvanatha Sastriyar thus:

However, his predictions have also proved to be wrong on certain occasions. His prediction of a lunar eclipse on 21 March 1828 was wrong by fifteen minutes. His prediction of the character of the eclipse also proved to be wrong as the eclipse was only a three-eighths eclipse and not five-eighths as he had predicted.

As poet 

Visvanathan also composed a number of poetical works. Notable among them were a Chola-era mythological Mavaikuruvanji and Kurunathar Killividudutu a panegyric on the Hindu god Skanda.

Death 

Visvanatha Sastriyar died in 1845.

Notes

References 

 

1756 births
1845 deaths
Sri Lankan Tamil astronomers
Sri Lankan Tamil writers
Tamil poets